The Saint-Jacques River is a tributary of the Portneuf River, flowing in the municipalities of Pont-Rouge and Saint-Basile, in the Portneuf Regional County Municipality, in the administrative region of Capitale-Nationale, in the province of Quebec, Canada.

The Saint-Jacques river flows mainly in agricultural areas, the main economic activity in this small valley. Its course crosses a few forest islands.

This small valley is served by the chemin du rang Saint-Jacques (lower part) and the chemin du rang Terrebonne (upper part).

The surface of the Saint-Jacques river (except the rapids areas) is generally frozen from the beginning of December to the end of March; however, safe circulation on the ice is generally from late December to early March. The water level of the river varies with the seasons and the precipitation; the spring flood occurs in March or April.

Geography 
The Saint-Jacques river originates in an agricultural area, on the west side of a small hamlet served by rue Germain and by chemin du rang Terrebonne, in Pont-Rouge.

This source is located at:
  north-west of the railway;
  west of Pont-Rouge town center;
  north-east of the village center of Saint-Basile;
  north-east of the mouth of the Saint-Jacques River;
  north of the confluence of the Jacques-Cartier River and Saint Lawrence river.

  to the southwest in an agricultural zone, collecting a first stream (coming from the north) which drains a marsh area and a second an unidentified stream (coming from the north), up to on chemin du rang Saint-Jacques;
  first towards the west, then towards the south, along the chemin du rang Saint-Jacques on the west side of the road, to its mouth.

The Saint-Jacques river flows in a river loop (stretching east) on the east bank of the Portneuf River. From the mouth of the Saint-Jacques river, the current descends on  the Portneuf river, winding south-west through the St. Lawrence plain, to the north shore of St. Lawrence River.

Toponymy 
The toponym "Rivière Saint-Jacques" was formalized on December 5, 1968, at the Place Names Bank of the Commission de toponymie du Québec.

See also 

 List of rivers of Quebec

References 

Rivers of Capitale-Nationale